Malatesta da Verucchio (1212–1312) was the founder of the powerful Italian Malatesta family and a notable condottiero. He was born in Verucchio. He was the son of Malatesta della Penna (1183-1248). 

He was the leader of the Guelphs in Romagna and became podestà (chief magistrate) of Rimini in 1239. In 1295, he made himself undisputed ruler of Rimini by killing the chief members of the rival Ghibelline family, the Parcitati, including their leader Montagna. 

His eldest son was Giovanni Malatesta, famous for the 1285 tragedy, recorded in Dante's Inferno, in which he killed his wife Francesca da Polenta and his younger brother Paolo, having discovered them in adultery. 

He was succeeded as seignior of Rimini by his sons, first by Malatestino and later by Pandolfo I.

References

1212 births
1312 deaths
People from the Province of Rimini
House of Malatesta
13th-century condottieri
Italian centenarians
Men centenarians